Next to You is the twenty-eighth studio album by American country music singer-songwriter Tammy Wynette. It was released on March 7, 1989, by Epic Records.

Commercial performance
The album reached No. 42 on the Billboard Top Country Albums chart. The album's first single, "Next to You", peaked at No. 51 on the Billboard Hot Country Singles chart, and the second single, "Thank the Cowboy for the Ride", peaked at No. 66.

Track listing

Personnel
Norro Wilson - producer
Denny Purcell - mastering
Bill Johnson - album art direction
Randee St. Nicholas - album photography
Randal Mertin - art assistance

Chart positions

Album

Singles

References

1989 albums
Epic Records albums
Tammy Wynette albums
Albums produced by Norro Wilson